Tubabao is an island off the southeastern point of Samar Island. It is one of the islands comprising the town of Guiuan in the province of Eastern Samar, in east central Philippines. The island is located close to the town centre.

During World War II the island was part of a large US Navy base Leyte-Samar Naval Base.

Refugees from Russia

Tubabao was used by the International Refugee Organization (IRO) in 1949 and 1950 to provide a temporary refuge for 5,000 Russian refugees escaping from China.

The Russians were survivors of the October Revolution and Russian Civil War, when the Russian monarchy was overthrown by the Bolsheviks. Some Russians managed to escape and took refuge in foreign lands.

Many of them moved to China, especially Harbin and Shanghai.  Most of these refugees survived the Second World War but the communists took power in China and thus the IRO requested all countries around the world to provide accommodation to the Russians. The Philippines volunteered, and offered the Tubabao Island.

The Russian refugees later were granted to stay in the United States, Australia, Canada and South American countries.  Most refugees became citizens of the countries in which they settled.

References

External links

The Independent 12/03/2013: A forgotten episode in Russian history leaves links with the Philippines
When the Philippines welcomed Russian refugees

Islands of Eastern Samar